Ira Clinton Welborn  (February 13, 1874 – July 13, 1956) was a United States Army colonel who was a recipient of the Medal of Honor for valor in action on July 2, 1898, at Santiago, Cuba.

Early life and Spanish–American War

Ira C. Welborn was born in Mico, Mississippi. He graduated from the United States Military Academy at West Point as a member of the class of 1898. Just a few weeks after his graduation from the Academy he was assigned as a 2nd lieutenant to the 9th Infantry Regiment, to serve in the Spanish–American War. He was awarded the Medal of Honor for his actions at the Battle of San Juan Hill, near Santiago, Cuba, on July 2, 1898, which he received on June 21, 1899.

Medal of Honor citation
Rank and organization: Second Lieutenant, 9th U.S. Infantry. Place and date: At Santiago, Cuba, 2 July 1898. Entered service at: Mico, Miss. Birth: Mico, Miss. Date of issue: 21 June 1899.

Citation:

Voluntarily left shelter and went, under fire, to the aid of a private of his company who was wounded.

Later career
Welborn served in three other conflicts: the Philippine–American War, the Boxer Rebellion, and World War I, eventually rising to the rank of colonel. He served as a Tactical Officer at West Point, 1904–1906. After the tank was introduced to the battlefield in World War I, Welborn was detailed to be the first head of the fledgling United States Army Tank Service, for which he received the Distinguished Service Medal. He retired from service in 1932.

He was a member of the Society of the Army of Santiago de Cuba and the Military Order of the Dragon.

Personal life
Wellborn died in Gulfport, Mississippi, on July 13, 1956. His son, John C. Welborn, also attended West Point, rose to the rank of colonel, and commanded the United States Army's 33rd Armored Regiment during World War II.

References

External links

 
 

1874 births
1956 deaths
United States Army Medal of Honor recipients
United States Military Academy alumni
American military personnel of the Spanish–American War
American military personnel of the Philippine–American War
United States Army personnel of World War I
Spanish–American War recipients of the Medal of Honor
People from Jones County, Mississippi